Once Upon a Dream is an Australian children's television series. It airs on Network Ten. The six episodes take you behind the scenes of the Australian Ballet's production of Swan Lake. It is a documentary style series.

References

Network 10 original programming
Australian children's television series
2012 Australian television series debuts